The O‘zbekiston Kubogi or ( or ) Uzbek Cup is the top knockout tournament in Uzbek football (soccer).

Previous champions
All champions as Uzbek SSR in Soviet times:

1939: Dinamo Tashkent
1940: Dinamo Tashkent
1941: no tournament
1942: Dinamo Tashkent
1943: Dinamo Tashkent
1944: Khar'kovskoye Tankovoye Uchilishche Chirchik
1945: Khar'kovskoye Tankovoye Uchilishche Chirchik
1946: DO Tashkent
1947: Pishchevik Tashkent
1948: Avtozavod im. Chkalova Tashkent
1949: Dinamo Tashkent
1950: Start Tashkent
1951: Start Tashkent
1952: Dinamo Tashkent
1953: Khimik Chirchik
1954: ODO Tashkent
1955: Spartak Samarkand
1956: Sbornaya Fergany
1957: Khimik Chirchik
1958: Mekhnat Tashkent
1959: Khimik Chirchik
1960: SKA-2 Tashkent
1961: Vostok Yangiabad
1962: Sokol Tashkent
1963: Tekstilshchik Tashkent
1964: Tashkentkabel' Tashkent
1965: Tashkabel' Tashkent
1966: Zvezda Tashkent
1967: Vostok Tashkent
1968: Tashkabel' Tashkent
1969: Zvezda Tashkent
1970: DYuSSh-2 Tashkent
1971: SKA Tashkent
1972: Lenin-yuly Karshi
1973: Stroitel' Samarkand
1974: Tong Karshi
1975: Traktor Tashkent
1976: Narimanovets Khorezmskaya Obl.
1977: Karshistroy Karshi
1978: Khorezm (Kolkhoz im. Narimanova)
1979: Khizar Shakhrisabz
1980: FK Khiva
1981: no tournament
1982: no tournament
1983: Tselinnik Turtkul'
1984: Avtomobilist Fergana
1985: Metallurg Bekabad (?)
1986: Avtomobilist Tashkent
1987: Avtomobilist Tashkent
1988: Avtomobilist Tashkent
1989: Korazhida Ferganskaya Oblast'
1990: Metallurg Bekabad
1991: Instrumental'shchik Tashkent

These are all the Uzbek champions since the country's independence in 1992.

1992: Navbahor Namangan
1993: Pakhtakor
1994: Neftchi
1995: Navbahor Namangan
1996: Neftchi
1997: Pakhtakor
1998: Navbahor Namangan
1999: not held
2000: Dustlik
2001: Pakhtakor
2002: Pakhtakor
2003: Pakhtakor
2004: Pakhtakor
2005: Pakhtakor
2006: Pakhtakor
2007: Pakhtakor
2008: Bunyodkor
2009: Pakhtakor
2010: Bunyodkor
2011: Pakhtakor
2012: Bunyodkor
2013: Bunyodkor
2014: Lokomotiv Tashkent
2015: Nasaf Qarshi
2016: Lokomotiv Tashkent
2017: Lokomotiv Tashkent
2018: AGMK
2019: Pakhtakor
2020: Pakhtakor
2021: Nasaf Qarshi
2022: Nasaf Qarshi

Performance by club

List of finals
The following is a collection of all finals including goal scorers.

References

 
1
National association football cups
Recurring sporting events established in 1992
1992 establishments in Uzbekistan